Henry I (1070 – 1103), nicknamed the Old, a member of the House of Wettin, was Count of Eilenburg as well as Margrave of the Saxon Eastern March (March of Lusatia) from 1081 and Margrave of Meissen from 1089 until his death.

Life
Henry was the son of the Wettin margrave Dedi I of Lusatia and his second wife Adela of Louvain, a granddaughter of Count Lambert I of Louvian and widow of Margrave Otto I of Meissen. His father ruled the Lusatian march since 1046; he was one of the nobles which joined the Saxon Rebellion in 1073–75, but he quickly approached the Salian king Henry IV and was able to retain his margraviate until his death in 1075. Nevertheless, he had to extradite his minor son and heir Henry to the king as a hostage.

Henry was remained in captivity until in 1081 the king enfeoffed him with the March of Lusatia to curb Bohemian influence. It had previously been enfeoffed to Duke Vratislaus II of Bohemia in turn for his support against the Saxon insurgents, but he had never been confirmed in his possession.

Later, in 1089, he was also granted the Margraviate of Meissen by Emperor Henry IV. He was the first of the House of Wettin to govern that march, following the deposition of the Brunonid margrave Egbert II, who had sided with anti-king Hermann of Salm. About 1102 Margrave Henry married Egbert's daughter Gertrude of Brunswick (d. 1117) to further legitimate his claims. From this marriage he had one posthumous son, his successor Henry II. As Gertrude of Brunswick is sometimes nicknamed the Younger and there is no candidate for "Gertrude the Elder", the nickname must have come from confusion with an otherwise unattested daughter named Gertrude.

Margrave Henry was killed fighting against the Polabian Slavs near the Neisse river.

Notes

References

Further reading
Thompson, James Westfall. Feudal Germany, Volume II. New York: Frederick Ungar Publishing Co., 1928.

1070s births
1103 deaths
House of Wettin
Margraves of Meissen
Margraves of the Saxon Ostmark
People from Grimma